Kurt Gerhard Fenske (3 May 1930 – 1 October 2022) was a German economist and politician. A member of the Socialist Unity Party, he served in the Volkskammer from 1967 to 1990.

Fenske died in Berlin on 1 October 2022, at the age of 92.

References

1930 births
2022 deaths
Members of the Volkskammer
Socialist Unity Party of Germany members
Leipzig University alumni
Politicians from Berlin